Adonis (born Michael A. Smith, current legal name Adonis M. Smith; January 4, 1963) is a pioneering American acid house musician. Adonis is best known for his early Chicago house tracks "No Way Back" and "We're Rockin Down the House".

Musical career
Born and raised on the West Side of Chicago, Adonis was introduced to music at a young age. He studied contemporary jazz at the American Conservatory of Music. Later on, he played bass guitar in several R&B bands and was eventually introduced to the house scene in Chicago through hearing Jesse Saunders' "On and On".

As Michael A. Smith, he was a member of the band Clockwork. They recorded "I'm Your Candy Girl" (1984), a post-disco boogie song.

In 1986, Adonis released "No Way Back", which is considered to be one of the most influential Chicago house tracks. The single, by estimate, sold over 100,000 copies and was selected as number 14 by on the 2014 Rolling Stone list of the 20 best Chicago house records.

Partial discography
As Adonis
 "No Way Back"  (1986, Adonis Recordings)
 "We're Rocking Down the House"  (1986, Adonis Recordings)
 "Acid Poke"  (1988, Desire Records)
 "H.O.U.S.E."   (1988, Black Market Records)
 "Do You Wanna Jack"  b/w "Lost in the Sound"  (1989, Jack Trax)
With The Endless Poker's
 "! The Poke !"  (1987, D.J. International Records)
With Clockwork
 "I'm Your Candy Girl"  (1984, Private I Records)
 "Night Life"  (1985, The Network)
 "Feela-La-La"  (1987, City Street Records)
With Jack Frost & The Circle Jerks 
 "Two The Max" lp (1988, Adonis Recordings)

References

External links
 
 
 Global Darkness History of Chicago House

American electronic musicians
American house musicians
Acid house musicians
American boogie musicians
Musicians from Chicago
DJs from Chicago
Living people
1963 births